Fordonia leucobalia is an aquatic snake known by the common names crab-eating water snake and white-bellied mangrove snake. It is a common resident of mangrove swamps and tropical tidal wetlands from coast of Southeast Asia to Indonesia and the coasts of Northern Australia.

Individual F. leucobalia reach up to a meter in length, and are brown or gray in color with a white belly. There is significant color variation. Some have spots. The anatomy reflects the snake's water-living lifestyle: the eyes are located atop the head, and the nostrils have valves that close when the snake dives.

The snake eats small prey that live in its habitat, such as frogs and small fish, and it specializes in crabs, hence its name. Like other homalopsines, F. leucobalia bears live young.

References

 Boulenger, George A. 1890 The Fauna of British India, Including Ceylon and Burma. Reptilia and Batrachia. Taylor & Francis, London, xviii, 541 pp.
 Frith,C.B. & MacIver,D. 1978 The crab-eating Water Snake, Fordonia leucobalia (Schlegel), another snake new to Thailand. Nat. Hist. Bull. Siam Soc. (Bangkok) 27: 189-191
 Schlegel, H. 1837 Essai sur la physionomie des serpens. Partie Généralxxviii +251 S. + Partie Descriptiv606 S. + xvi. La Haye (J. Kips, J. HZ. et W. P. van Stockum)

External links
 [www.reptile-database.org]
 Field Museum: Mud Snakes
 Fordonia at Life is Short, but Snakes are Long

Colubrids
Fauna of Southeast Asia
Reptiles of Thailand
Reptiles of Indonesia
Reptiles of Western Australia
Monotypic snake genera
Taxa named by John Edward Gray